Thanks may refer to:

 Thank you, a common expression of gratitude

Film and television
 Thanks (film), a 2011 American film
 Thanks (TV series), a 1999 American sitcom

Music

Albums
 Thanks, by Ivan Neville, 1994
 Thanks, by Marty Grosz, 1997
 Thanks, by w-inds., 2006

Songs
 "Thanks" (song), by Bill Anderson, 1975
 "Thanks!", by GAM, 2006
 "Thanks", by J. Vincent Edwards, 1969
 "Thanks", by the James Gang from James Gang Rides Again, 1970
 "Thanks", by Judith Allen and by Bing Crosby from the Too Much Harmony soundtrack, 1933
 "Thanks", by Waylon Jennings from Ladies Love Outlaws, 1972

See also
 
 
 Thankful (disambiguation)
 Thank God (disambiguation)
 Thank You (disambiguation)